Jazz in Paris: Nuages is a compilation album of recordings by Jazz guitarist Django Reinhardt, released in 2003. The album was recorded in 1953; the first eight tracks on 10 March and the other four on 8 April.

Track listing
"Blues for Ike" (Django Reinhardt) – 3:24
"September Song" (Kurt Weill, Maxwell Anderson) – 2:35
"Night and Day" (Cole Porter) – 2:52
"Insensiblement" (Paul Misraki) – 3:10
"Manoir de Mes Rêves" (Reinhardt) – 2:38
"Nuages" (Reinhardt) – 3:18
"Aquarela do Brazil" (Ary Barroso; Bob Russel) – 2:27
"I'm Confessin' (That I Love You)" (Al J. Neiburg, Doc Daugherty, Ellis Reynolds) – 3:39
"Le Soir" (Reinhardt) – 2:58
"Chez Moi À Six Heures" (Paul Misraki) – 3:00
"I Cover the Waterfront" (Edward Heyman; Johnny Green) – 3:27
"Deccaphonie" (Reinhardt) – 3:15

Personnel 
Django Reinhardt – electric guitar
Pierre Lemarchand – drums
Pierre Michelot – double bass
Martial Solal – piano
Maurice Vander – piano
Jean-Louis Viale – drums
Production notes:
Christophe Henault – digital remastering
Daniel Richard – production coordination

Django Reinhardt albums
Jazz compilation albums
2003 compilation albums
EmArcy Records compilation albums